Quaker Run is a tributary of West Branch Mahantango Creek in Juniata County, Pennsylvania, in the United States. The stream has no named tributaries, but several unnamed tributaries, and is located largely between Graders Ridge and Dresslers Ridge. Its drainage basin is designated as a Coldwater Fishery and a Migratory Fishery.

Course
Quaker Run begins to the east of a road in Monroe Township. It flows east-northeast through a valley for a few miles, flowing between Dresslers Ridge and Graders Ridge. In this reach, the stream receives an unnamed tributary from the left and eventually begins to meander, though still going in the same general direction, and receiving another unnamed tributary from the left. The stream eventually begins meandering in a generally easterly direction for more than a mile, receiving two unnamed tributaries from the left and two from the right. It continues flowing east and after a few tenths of a mile, it reaches the end of its valley. A short distance further downstream, the stream reaches its confluence with West Branch Mahantango Creek near the border between Juniata County and Snyder County.

Geography and geology

Quaker Run is mostly situated between Dresslers Ridge to the south and Graders Ridge to the north, in eastern Monroe Township.

A series of gray shales exposed along Quaker Run and dipping 30 degrees southeast, has been observed. Gray and brown boulders of conglomerate containing some iron and white quartz have also been observed in the vicinity of the stream.

Watershed and biology
The stream is entirely within the United States Geological Survey quadrangle of Richfield. Its mouth is located near Richfield.

Quaker Run is one of the main streams in Monroe Township, along with Stony Run and West Branch Mahantango Creek.

The drainage basin of Quaker Run is designated as a Coldwater Fishery and a Migratory Fishery.

History
Quaker Run was entered into the Geographic Names Information System on August 2, 1979. Its identifier in the Geographic Names Information System is 1184524.

A schoolhouse was erected in the vicinity of Quaker Run in 1838.

See also
Leiningers Run, next tributary of West Branch Mahantango Creek going downstream
List of rivers of Pennsylvania

References

External links
Image of Quaker Run

Rivers of Juniata County, Pennsylvania
Tributaries of the Susquehanna River
Rivers of Pennsylvania